Norway competed in the Eurovision Song Contest 2004, represented by Knut Anders Sørum with the song "High". The song was chosen as the Norwegian entry for the 2004 contest through the Melodi Grand Prix contest.

Before Eurovision

Melodi Grand Prix 2004 
Melodi Grand Prix 2004 was the Norwegian national final that selected Norway's entry for the Eurovision Song Contest 2004.

Competing entries 
A submission period was opened by NRK where songwriters of any nationality were allowed to submit entries. At the close of the deadline, 530 submissions were received. Twelve songs were selected for the competition by a jury panel.

Final 
The final took place on 6 March 2004 at the Oslo Spektrum in Oslo, hosted by Ivar Dyrhaug. The winner was selected over two rounds of regional televoting. In the first round, the top four entries were selected to proceed to the second round, the Gold Final. The results of the public televote were revealed by Norway's five regions, with the televoting figures of each region being converted to points. The top ten songs received 1–8, 10 and 12 points. In the Gold Final, the results of the public televote, based on actual voting figures of each region, were revealed by Norway's five regions and led to the victory of "High" performed by Knut Anders Sørum with 82,427 votes.

At Eurovision
As Jostein Hasselgård came fourth for Norway at the Eurovision Song Contest 2003, Norway was an automatic finalist for the 2004 Eurovision final, held on 15 May. On the night of the final Knut Anders Sørum performed third in the running order, following Austria and preceding France. Norway received 3 points for Knut's performance of "High", all from neighbours Sweden, coming 24th and last. This was Norway's tenth last place finish in Eurovision, a record that is, as of 2019, yet to be broken. As Norway failed to reach the top 12 in the final, the country was forced to compete in the semi-final of the 2005 Contest.

Voting

Points awarded to Norway

Points awarded by Norway

References

External links
Norwegian National Final 2004

2004
Countries in the Eurovision Song Contest 2004
2004
Eurovision
Eurovision